Chhata Pipra is a town in Gadhimai Municipality  in Bara District in the Narayani Zone of south-eastern Nepal. The formerly Village Development Committee was merged to form new municipality on 18 May 2014.  At the time of the 2011 Nepal census it had a population of 7,175 persons living in 1,065 individual households. There were 3,674 males and 3,501 females at the time of census.

References

External links
UN map of the municipalities of Bara District

Populated places in Bara District